The 2020–21 SV Wehen Wiesbaden season is the 95th season in the club's football history. In 2020–21 the club plays in the 3. Liga, the third tier of German football alongside the DFB-Pokal and the Hesse Cup.

Team

Transfers

In

Out

New contracts

Friendlies

Competitions
Times from 1 July to 25 October 2020 and from 28 March to 30 June 2021 are UTC+2, from 26 October 2020 to 27 March 2021 UTC+1.

Overview

3. Liga

League table

Results summary

Result round by round

Matches

DFB-Pokal

Hesse Cup

Statistics

Squad statistics

Goals

Clean sheets

Disciplinary record

References

External links

Wehen Wiesbaden
SV Wehen Wiesbaden seasons